Jan Gan (also Romanized as Jān Gān, Jangān, and Jāngān) is a village in Band-e Zarak Rural District, in the Central District of Minab County, Hormozgan Province, Iran. At the 2006 census, its population was 177, in 36 families.

References 

Populated places in Minab County